The following table indicates the party of elected officials in the U.S. state of South Dakota:
Governor
Lieutenant Governor
Secretary of State
Attorney General
State Auditor
State Treasurer
Commissioner of School and Public Lands

The table also indicates the historical party composition in the:
State Senate
State House of Representatives
State Public Utilities Commission
State delegation to the U.S. Senate
State delegation to the U.S. House of Representatives

For years in which a presidential election was held, the table indicates which party's candidate received the state's electoral votes.

See also
Politics in South Dakota
Government of South Dakota

References

Politics of South Dakota
Government of South Dakota
South Dakota